Vatan is a French commune in the Indre department in Centre-Val de Loire region. The town has been labeled Village étape since 1997 and Ville fleurie with 2 flowers.

Population

See also
Communes of the Indre department

References

Gallery

Communes of Indre